Gunnar Christensen (27 August 1905 – 18 January 1988) was a Norwegian footballer. He played in nine matches for the Norway national football team from 1927 to 1928.

References

External links
 

1905 births
1988 deaths
Norwegian footballers
Norway international footballers
Sportspeople from Skien
Association football goalkeepers
Odds BK players